A blood compact is a ritual where two (or more) people drink a small amount of each other's blood.

Blood compact may also refer to:
 Sandugo, the blood compact performed between the Spanish explorer Miguel López de Legazpi and Datu Sikatuna of Bohol in 1565  in the Philippines.
 Blood compact (film), a 1972 Filipino film starring Joseph Estrada.
 The Blood Compact (Spanish: El Pacto de Sangre), an 1886 painting by Filipino painter and hero Juan Luna.
 

Rituals